The 1895–96 North Wales Coast League was the third season of the newly formed North Wales Coast League after its establishment in 1893. The league was won by Bangor, which is considered part of Bangor's 'Grand Slam' season as they also won the Welsh Cup, North Wales Coast Senior Cup and North West Wales Challenge Cup.

League table

References

External links
Welsh Football Data Archive

North Wales Coast League
North Wales